"Stripsearch" is a song from Faith No More's studio album, Album of the Year, and was set for release as a single in November 1997. Promotional CDs were produced and released and the single was added to radio playlists. However, the release was cancelled as the record company London Recordings decided to release their 1995 cover of "I Started a Joke" by the Bee Gees instead.

Musical style
The song was based on a song written by guitarist Jon Hudson, composed in simple MIDI format, hence the heavy electronic sound.

Music video
The video for "Stripsearch" was filmed in Berlin during 1997. It was directed by Philipp Stölzl, based on a screenplay written by Billy Gould.  In the video, Mike Patton walks through parts of the city. At about halfway through he arrives at a military checkpoint and stands at the back of a queue also containing the other members of the band. When he reaches the front, he hands over his passport for inspection. The man inspecting it finds something wrong with the papers and calls the guards on Patton, who tries to get away and is pinned to the floor at gunpoint and arrested. The video then shows still images set earlier in the day, highlighting previously unseen details that point to Patton being a criminal.

Reception
Tom Phalen of MTV said in 1997 that, "despite the inherent brutality of the title, [it] is almost ethereal."  NME wrote that the song had "smooth trip-hop rhythms" and "loose, swoozy guitar that sounds like it was recorded in the middle of Monument Valley." In their review of the 2016 deluxe edition for Album of the Year, PopMatters praised the "chilled-out paranoia" of the song.

Australian radio station Triple J ranked it 64th on their annual "Hottest 100" list for the year of 1997.

Track list
"Stripsearch"
"Collision" (Live from Night Town, Rotterdam on August 27, 1997)
"The Gentle Art of Making Enemies" (Live from Night Town, Rotterdam on August 27, 1997)
"Ashes to Ashes" (Live at Phoenix Festival '97 on July 27, 1997)

Charts

Footnotes

Trip hop songs
Faith No More songs
1997 singles
Songs written by Billy Gould
Songs written by Mike Patton
Songs written by Mike Bordin
Slash Records singles
1997 songs
Songs written by Jon Hudson
Strip search